Piotr Bryhadzin (24 August 1949 – 12 December 2021) was a Belarusian politician and historian.

References

1949 births
2021 deaths
People from Ivanava District
Government ministers of Belarus
Communist Party of Byelorussia politicians
20th-century Belarusian historians
Belarusian male writers
Male non-fiction writers